Pyncostola semnochroa is a moth of the family Gelechiidae. It was described by Edward Meyrick in 1913. It is found in South Africa, where it has been recorded from Mpumalanga and KwaZulu-Natal.

The wingspan is 22–25 mm. The forewings are deep brown with the margins and veins marked with slender streaks of dark fuscous suffusion mixed with whitish. The hindwings are grey.

References

Endemic moths of South Africa
Moths described in 1913
Pyncostola